The 9th "Odessa" Guards Fighter Aviation Regiment was a "regiment of aces" unit in the Soviet Air Forces created to assist the USSR in gaining air supremacy over the Luftwaffe during the Second World War.

Second World War 
Pilots admitted to the regiment were either already aces or considered potential aces by their commanders. Throughout the war the regiment operated various aircraft, including the Polikarpov I-16, LaGG-3, Yak-1, Bell P-39 Airacobra, and Lavochkin La-7. Prior to being designated as the 9th Guards Regiment in 1942, the unit was the known as the 69th Fighter Aviation Regiment and equipped with I-16 and MiG-3 fighters, having been formed in 1939. With 558 enemy aircraft destroyed by the unit during World War II, it was the 7th highest scoring regiment in the Soviet Air Forces.

Name 
Before the regiment was honored with the Guards designation in 1942 it was known as the 69th Fighter Aviation Regiment. Later the regiment was given the honorific "Odessa" in 1943, and by the end of the war its full name was the 9th Guards Odessa Red Banner Order of Suvorov Fighter Aviation Regiment. After the capitulation of Nazi Germany, the regiment saw action in the Korean War before it was incorporated into the Air Force of Uzbekistan as the 62nd Fighter Aviation Regiment in 1992 after the dissolution of the Soviet Union.

Notable members

Twice Heroes of the Soviet Union 

 Aleksey Alelyukhin
 Amet-khan Sultan
 Pavel Golovachev
 Vladimir Lavrinenkov

Heroes of the Soviet Union 
 Mikhail Astashkin
 Mikhail Baranov
 Georgy Baykov
 Ivan Borisov
 Aleksey Cherevatenko
 Yevgeny Dranishchev
 Aleksandr Karasyov
 Arkady Kovachevich
 Ivan Korolev
 Georgy Kumzin
 Semyon Kunitsa
 Lydia Litvyak
 Aleksey Malanov
 Anatoly Morozov
 Yuri Rykachev
 Ivan Serzhantov
 Vasily Serogodsky
 Lev Shestakov
 Mikhail Shilov
 Mikhail Tvelenev
 Vitaly Topolsky
 Sergey Yelizarov
 Agey Yelokhin

Hero of the Russian Federation 
 Yekaterina Budanova

References

Holm, Michael. 9th Guards IAP. https://www.ww2.dk/new/air%20force/regiment/iap/9gviap.htm

Fighter regiments of the Soviet Air Forces
Fighter aviation regiments of the Soviet Union in World War II
Military units and formations established in 1942